The District Service Medal (DSM) was a medal awarded in lieu of the General Service Medal (Rhodesia) (GSM) for service on operations undertaken for the purpose of combating terrorists or enemy incursions into Rhodesia. It was awarded solely to African members of INTAF in uniform. This is unusual as non-whites in all other branches qualified for the GSM or the Prison Service Medal (PSM). The DSM is therefore the only racially exclusive service medal in the Rhodesian Honours System.

Medal 

The medal bears a relief portrait of Cecil Rhodes on the obverse and the words "FOR SERVICE" surrounded by a wreath of flame lilies on the reverse. The ribbon of the medal is a plain, dark blue. The medal was impressed in small capitals with the recipient's name, rank and service number on the rim.

Recipients

5470 Rhodesian District Service Medals were issued. Awards were not gazetted, and no full roll of recipients has ever been published.

References

1. THE HISTORY OF RHODESIAN HONOURS AND AWARDS, The Rhodesian Armed Forces

2. Gerry van Tonder

Military awards and decorations of Rhodesia